Moore's frog (Lithobates johni) is a species of frog in the true frog family (Ranidae). It is endemic to the Sierra Madre Oriental of Mexico.

Its natural habitats are subtropical or tropical moist lowland forests, subtropical or tropical moist montane forests, and rivers. It is threatened by habitat loss.

References

 
 
 
 

Lithobates
Endemic amphibians of Mexico
Fauna of the Sierra Madre Oriental
Taxonomy articles created by Polbot
Amphibians described in 2006